John Stephenson (c. 1709 – 17 April 1794) was a British Member of Parliament.

He was the son and heir of Thomas Stephenson of Bails and Crosslands, Alston, Cumbria and a Member of Parliament for various boroughs in the south-west from 1754 to 1755 and 1761 until his death in 1794. 

He was a director of the British East India Company from 1765 to 1768, and had government victualling contracts in Nova Scotia and Newfoundland at the time of the American Revolution.

References

1700s births
1794 deaths
British MPs 1754–1761
British MPs 1761–1768
British MPs 1768–1774
British MPs 1774–1780
British MPs 1780–1784
British MPs 1784–1790
British MPs 1790–1796
Members of the Parliament of Great Britain for Mitchell
Members of the Parliament of Great Britain for Tregony
Members of the Parliament of Great Britain for Plympton Erle
Directors of the British East India Company
People from Alston, Cumbria